Pedro del Campo (died 1551) was a Roman Catholic prelate who served as Auxiliary Bishop of Toledo (1516–1551) and Titular Bishop of Utica (1516–1551).

Biography
Pedro del Campo was born in Salamanca, Spain. On 4 Jul 1516, Pedro del Campo was appointed during the papacy of Pope Leo X as Auxiliary Bishop of Toledo and Titular Bishop of Utica and Auxiliary Bishop of Toledo (1516–1551). He served as Auxiliary Bishop of Toledo until his death in 1551. While bishop, he was the principal consecrator of Juan Yañez, Bishop of Calahorra y La Calzada (1544).

References

External links and additional sources
 (for Chronology of Bishops) 
 (for Chronology of Bishops)  
 (for Chronology of Bishops) 
 (for Chronology of Bishops)  

17th-century Roman Catholic bishops in Spain
1551 deaths
Bishops appointed by Pope Leo X
People from Salamanca